The Seymour Centre is a multi-purpose performing arts centre within the University of Sydney in the Australian city of Sydney. It is located on the corner of City Rd and Cleveland St in Chippendale, just south-west of the city centre.

The building was designed by architectural firm Allen Jack+Cottier and was opened in 1975. Internal refurbishments were carried out in 2000, designed by Lahz Nimmo Architects.

As well as the public performance areas, the building provides accommodation for the Department of Music at the University of Sydney.

History 
Sydney businessman, Everest York Seymour, died in 1966 and left a significant bequest for ‘...the construction of a building to serve as a centre for the cultivation, education and performance of musical and dramatic arts...'. The University of Sydney became the trustee of this bequest, and Allen Jack+Cottier were commissioned to design a performing arts centre to be known as The Seymour Centre.

Performance venues and facilities

The York Theatre 
The York is the largest theatre in the centre, with seating for 780 patrons . It has a Thrust stage configuration, with seats in a semi-circular, amphitheatre-style arrangement and is used for drama and musical performances, and spoken-word events.

The Everest Theatre 
The Everest theatre is an end-stage theatre, seating up to 605, depending on configuration. It was designed for musical performances and includes a variety of acoustic features to manipulate and control sound quality, but is also used for theatrical and dance performances.

The Reginald Theatre 
The Reginald Theatre, previously known as the Downstairs Theatre is a smaller, informal Studio theatre, seating up to 200, with a wide variety of uses.

The Sound Lounge 
An intimate cabaret style venue for up to 120, which serves light meals and refreshments.

Restaurants and Bars 
Refreshments are available on each level, including a coffee cart in the main foyer. A BBQ also operates in the front courtyard opposite the main entrance, from one and a half hours prior to selected shows.

Program 

Each year the Centre presents a wide range of performing arts productions and events; plays host to a number of festivals; provides an education program; presents children's theatre and produces dance, theatre and music productions. The Seymour enjoys a high public profile within Sydney, with a good central city location and parking facilities.

Festivals which program events at the Seymour centre include the Sydney Festival, the Sydney Gay and Lesbian Mardi Gras, the Sydney Children's Festival, the Sydney Fringe Festival and the Sydney Comedy Festival.

The program is an eclectic mix of self-produced work, co-productions and hires of the venue, and includes theatre, gigs, dance pieces and showcases. The University of Sydney student revues are held at the Seymour each year, as well as many end-of-year dance school concerts. The centre hosts family and kids' shows each school holiday, and has recently commenced a comprehensive primary and secondary education program, featuring workshops and Q&As to augment the students' experience of the theatre.

The Wiggles performed in this centre during their December 1996 concerts shown on their first concert video: "Wiggledance!".

References

External links 

 Seymour Centre Official Website
 Allen Jack+Cottier Official Website
 Lahz Nimno Architects Official Website
 Sydney Festival 2011

University of Sydney buildings
Music venues in Sydney
Theatres in Sydney
Chippendale, New South Wales
1975 establishments in Australia
Theatres completed in 1975